Gordon Ranald McLaurin (1862 – 13 October 1917) was an Australian politician.

Biography
McLaurin was born near Holbrook to Isabella  Rankin and James McLaurin, a pastoralist and politician. He was educated by a private tutor while growing up on his father's station, after which he worked for Goldsbrough Mort & Co. In 1891 he purchased his father's land.

McLaurin's father had briefly been a member of the New South Wales Legislative Assembly for The Hume, and Gordon also became a member of the Legislative Assembly representing The Hume, winning the seat at the 1901 by-election as the Progressive candidate. He transferred to Albury in 1904 and after the collapse of his party was one of few Progressives not to join the Liberal Party, continuing in parliament as an Independent Liberal. He held his seat in 1907, however he was defeated in 1913 by the Labor candidate.

References

 

1862 births
1917 deaths
Independent members of the Parliament of New South Wales
Members of the New South Wales Legislative Assembly